Dónall Ó Conalláin (1907 – 7 December 1987) was an Irish politician and teacher. He was first elected to Seanad Éireann as an independent member in 1961 for the National University constituency. He was re-elected at the 1965 election. He did not contest the 1969 election.

References

1907 births
1987 deaths
Independent members of Seanad Éireann
Members of the 10th Seanad
Members of the 11th Seanad
Irish schoolteachers
Members of Seanad Éireann for the National University of Ireland